Stig Lennart Blomqvist (born 29 July 1946) is a retired Swedish rally driver. He made his international breakthrough in 1971. Driving an Audi Quattro for the Audi factory team, Blomqvist won the World Rally Championship drivers' title in 1984 and finished runner-up in 1985. He won his home event, the Swedish Rally, seven times.

Outside the WRC, he won the British Rally Championship in 1983 and the Swedish Rally Championship several times. At the Race of Champions, Blomqvist took the title "Champion of Champions" in 1989 and 1990.

Career
Stig Blomqvist acquired his driving licence at the age of 18, and immediately took second place in a 1964 local rally event near the Swedish town of Karlstad, behind the wheel of a Saab 96. After his education as a driving instructor, together with later teammate Per Eklund at the Kvinnersta Folkhögskola outside of Örebro, he proceeded to drive with the Saab team, and achieved his first international victories in 1971; first winning the Swedish Rally, then the 1000 Lakes Rally in Finland and the RAC Rally in Great Britain. These performances helped Saab gain second place behind Alpine-Renault in the International Championship for Manufacturers, the predecessor to the World Rally Championship.

Blomqvist went on to win the Swedish Rally again in 1972 (Saab 96 V4), 1973 (Saab 96 V4), which marked his first WRC event and win, 1977 (Saab 99 EMS) and 1979 (Saab 99 Turbo). Outside the WRC, he won the 1973 Cyprus Rally, the 1976 Boucles de Spa and the Swedish Rally Championship several times. His long-time association with Saab ended when the Saab Sport department hung up their spurs in 1981. Driving a Talbot Sunbeam Lotus in 1981, Blomqvist finished eighth in the 1000 Lakes and third at the RAC.

For the 1982 season, Audi Sport, Audi's factory team, signed Blomqvist to drive the Quattro in a few events alongside Hannu Mikkola and Michèle Mouton. He won the Swedish Rally, finished second in the 1000 Lakes and then took his first WRC victory outside his home country by winning the Rallye Sanremo. Audi then signed Blomqvist as their third regular driver for the following season. Blomqvist scored seven podiums, including a win in the season-ending RAC Rally, and finished fourth in the drivers' world championship. In the British Rally Championship, he captured the title by winning four of the six events.

In the 1984 season, Blomqvist drove the Quattro A2 and the Sport Quattro evolutions to five victories, and finished second at the Monte Carlo Rally. Beating Mikkola to the title, he became the second Swedish world rally champion after Björn Waldegård. His first place in the Rallye Côte d'Ivoire would remain his career-last victory in the WRC. The 1985 season saw him finish runner-up to Timo Salonen of the new Peugeot Talbot Sport team headed by Jean Todt. His best result was second; at the Swedish Rally, the 1000 Lakes and the Acropolis Rally. In the last Group B season in 1986, Blomqvist competed for Ford in an RS200 and for Peugeot in a 205 Turbo 16 E2, recording his only podium at the Rally Argentina.

During the first two Group A years, Blomqvist continued with Ford and drove a Ford Sierra RS Cosworth, finishing on the podium three times. He also drove for Volkswagen Motorsport and finished third in a Golf Mk 2 16V on the 1989 Safari Rally.The 1990 WRC season was the series' first without Blomqvist in action. In 1991 and 1992, he drove a Nissan Sunny GTI-R for Nissan Motorsports Europe, Nissan's factory team. At the 1992 Swedish Rally, Blomqvist took third place, which would remain his last podium spot in the WRC.

Later in the 1990s, he used his experience of two-wheel drive cars and helped Škoda Motorsport to develop the Škoda Felicia Kit Car. During a guest appearance at the 1996 RAC Rally, when the event was not on the WRC schedule, the 50-year-old veteran finished third overall with the car. That same year, he finished seventh in the Safari Rally in a Ford Escort RS Cosworth. This would remain his last points-finish in the World Rally Championship.

After only three events in four years, Blomqvist returned to the role of a regular WRC competitor. Together with co-driver Ana Goñi, he drove a Group N category David Sutton Cars Mitsubishi Lancer Evo 6 in twelve events in 2001, finishing fifth overall in the Production World Rally Championship (PWRC). In 2003, he finished third in the PWRC championship in a Subaru Impreza WRX STI. In his last world rally, the 2006 Swedish Rally, Blomqvist drove the Impreza to 24th place overall and was fourth fastest in Group N.

In September 2008, Blomqvist was due to take part in the Colin McRae Forest Stages Rally, a round of the Scottish Rally Championship centred in Perth in Scotland, in a Ford Escort Mk2 with Goñi as his co-driver. The rally was held in memory of McRae, who died in 2007.

He has lived in the UK for many years, based in Saffron Walden, Essex.  His son, Tom Blomqvist, has followed in his motorsports footsteps, becoming the youngest ever Formula Renault UK champion in 2010, at the age of 16.

WRC victories
{|class="wikitable"
!  # 
! Event
! Season
! Co-driver
! Car
|-
| 1
|  Swedish Rally
| 1973
| Arne Hertz
| Saab 96 V4
|-
| 2
|  Swedish Rally
| 1977
| Hans Sylvan
| Saab 99 EMS
|-
| 3
|  Swedish Rally
| 1979
| Björn Cederberg
| Saab 99 Turbo
|-
| 4
|  Swedish Rally
| 1982
| Björn Cederberg
| Audi Quattro
|-
| 5
|  Rallye Sanremo
| 1982
| Björn Cederberg
| Audi Quattro
|-
| 6
|  RAC Rally
| 1983
| Björn Cederberg
| Audi Quattro A2
|-
| 7
|  Swedish Rally
| 1984
| Björn Cederberg
| Audi Quattro A2
|-
| 8
|  Acropolis Rally
| 1984
| Björn Cederberg
| Audi Quattro A2
|-
| 9
|  Rally of New Zealand
| 1984
| Björn Cederberg
| Audi Quattro A2
|-
| 10
|  Rally Argentina
| 1984
| Björn Cederberg
| Audi Quattro A2
|-
| 11
|  Rallye Côte d'Ivoire
| 1984
| Björn Cederberg
| Audi Sport Quattro
|}

Racing record

Complete IMC results

Complete WRC results

Complete FIA European Rallycross Cup results

Overall

Complete FIA European Rallycross Championship results

Touringcar Division

Division 2

Complete World Touring Car Championship results
(key) (Races in bold indicate pole position) (Races in italics indicate fastest lap)

† Not eligible for points.

Complete British Touring Car Championship results
(key) (Races in bold indicate pole position in class) (Races in italics indicate fastest lap in class)

‡ Endurance driver – not eligible for points

References

External links 

Blomqvist at World Rally Archive

1946 births
Living people
Sportspeople from Örebro
Swedish rally drivers
British Touring Car Championship drivers
Swedish Touring Car Championship drivers
World Rally Champions
World Rally Championship drivers
European Rallycross Championship drivers
European Rally Championship drivers
Swedish expatriates in New Zealand
Swedish expatriate sportspeople in the United Kingdom
Carrera Panamericana drivers
Peugeot Sport drivers
Audi Sport drivers
Nismo drivers
Volkswagen Motorsport drivers
Škoda Motorsport drivers